Norris Stephen Falla  (3 May 1883–6 November 1945) was a New Zealand shipping company manager, military leader and aviation promoter. He was born in Westport, New Zealand, on 3 May 1883.

In 1935, he was awarded the King George V Silver Jubilee Medal.

References

1883 births
1945 deaths
People from Westport, New Zealand
New Zealand military personnel
New Zealand aviators
New Zealand Companions of the Distinguished Service Order
New Zealand Companions of the Order of St Michael and St George